The Class 700 was a class of steam tank shunting locomotives with 0-8-0 wheel arrangement operated by the Chōsen Railway in colonial Korea, built by Hitachi of Japan.

Their fate after the Liberation and partition of Korea is unknown.

References

Locomotives of Korea
Railway locomotives introduced in 1927
0-8-0 locomotives
Hitachi locomotives
Narrow gauge steam locomotives of Korea
Chosen Railway